Ericeia amanda is a moth in the  family Erebidae. It is found on Borneo, Sumatra and Peninsular Malaysia. The original description notes Adelaide, Australia as type locality, but the species is not known from Australia.

Adults are similar to Ericeia elongata, but are more rufous brown. Furthermore, the forewing fasciation is more strongly sinuous, and there is usually whitish suffusion in a postmedial band.

Taxonomy
Although Poole placed E. intracta as a synonym of Ericeia inangulata in 1989, it is instead a synonym for E. amanda.

References

Moths described in 1858
Moths of Borneo